INS Dwarka is a Forward Operating Base (FOB) of the Indian Navy and is located at Okha, Gujarat.

History 
INS Dwarka has historical significance as it is the only Indian Navy establishment to have ever seen direct action with the adversary. Its origin can be traced back to the 1965 hostilities with Pakistan. On 7 Sep 1965, a flotilla of the Pakistan Navy, carried out bombardment on Dwarka town with the objective of disabling the radar station there. Although the limited engagement caused insignificant damage of no strategic value, the Indian Navy realized the inevitable requirement to establish a forward outpost nearer to Pakistan. As a result, a small forward outpost was created in Feb 1966 at Port Okha under Naval Officer-in-Charge (Kathiawar). On 26 Nov 1972, this small outpost comprising four officer and 59 sailors was commissioned as INS Dwarka in its present location. NOIC (Kathiawar) was re-designated as NOIC (Saurashtra) on 7 Jul 1983. In Mar 1985, the office of NOIC (Saurashtra) was bifurcated and an officer of the rank of Commander was appointed as Commanding Officer, INS Dwarka.

It is currently under the operational and administrative command of NOIC (Gujarat).

Objective 
The primary role of INS Dwarka is defence of Port Okha and to provide infrastructure, operation logistics and diving support to naval ships. It helps in maintaining surveillance of north Arabian Sea and other deep water channels.

It also provides administrative and logistic support to all units of the Indian Coast Guard stationed at Okha Coast Guard Station. It helps in coordination of patrolling by Sagar Prahari Bal and Gujarat Marine Police training. Griffon-GRSE 8000 TD-Class Hovercraft are based at this station. Penant numbers

Specifications

See also 
 Indian navy 
 List of Indian Navy bases
 List of active Indian Navy ships

 Integrated commands and units
 Armed Forces Special Operations Division
 Defence Cyber Agency
 Integrated Defence Staff
 Integrated Space Cell
 Indian Nuclear Command Authority
 Indian Armed Forces
 Special Forces of India

 Other lists
 Strategic Forces Command
 List of Indian Air Force stations
 List of Indian Navy bases
 India's overseas military bases

References 

Vajrabahu